The Deadly Game is a 1982 American-British made-for-television thriller film that premiered on HBO. The intellectual thriller was directed by George Schaefer and adapted from a 1960 play by James Yaffe that was in turn based on the novel A Dangerous Game by Swiss author Friedrich Dürrenmatt. It stars George Segal as an American tourist traveling in the Swiss Alps who is lured into a dangerous mock trial by retired Swiss lawyers played by Trevor Howard, Robert Morley, and Emlyn Williams.

The film, which was made in London, received critical acclaim. It received the CableACE Award for best single program, along five additional nominations, including ones for the performances of Segal and Howard. The film also served as actor Alan Webb's final screen performance.

Cast
George Segal - Howard Trapp 
Trevor Howard - Gustave Kummer 
Robert Morley - Emile Carpeau 
Emlyn Williams - Bernard Laroque 
Alan Webb - Joseph Pillet 
Lesley Dunlop - Nicole 
Brian Croucher - Pierre 
Connie Booth - Helen Trapp

See also
The Most Wonderful Evening of My Life (1972)

References

External links

 

1982 television films
1982 films
1982 thriller films
British thriller television films
Films based on works by Friedrich Dürrenmatt
Films set in country houses
Films set in the Alps
Films directed by George Schaefer
HBO Films films
American thriller television films
1980s English-language films
1980s American films
1980s British films